Golden Woman is a legendary idol of Siberian peoples

Golden Woman may also refer to:
Gëlle Fra, a nickname of the war memorial in Luxembourg
La mujer dorada, a Mexican TV soap opera
An alias of the Golden Girl of Marvel Comics
The Golden Woman, a 1913 adventure novel by Ridgwell Cullum
:ru:Золотая баба (фильм), a 1987 Russian film based on the legend about the Golden Woman